Thwaites Glacier, nicknamed the Doomsday Glacier, is an unusually broad and vast Antarctic glacier flowing into Pine Island Bay, part of the Amundsen Sea, east of Mount Murphy, on the Walgreen Coast of Marie Byrd Land. In 1967, the Advisory Committee on Antarctic Names named the glacier after Fredrik T. Thwaites (1883–1961), a glacial geologist, geomorphologist and professor emeritus at the University of Wisconsin–Madison.

Thwaites Glacier is closely monitored for its potential to raise sea levels. Along with the Pine Island Glacier, it has been described as part of the "weak underbelly" of the West Antarctic Ice Sheet, because of its apparent vulnerability to significant retreat. This hypothesis is based on both theoretical studies of the stability of marine ice sheets and observations of large changes on these two glaciers. In recent years, the flow of both of these glaciers has accelerated, their surfaces have lowered, and their grounding lines have retreated.

The Thwaites Ice Shelf, a floating ice shelf which braces and restrains the eastern portion of Thwaites Glacier, is likely to collapse within a decade from 2021. Its outflow and contribution to sea-level rise would accelerate substantially; while it currently amounts to 4% of global sea level rise, it would become equivalent to 5% in the short term, and likely accelerate further in the longer term.

Research
In 2002, a team of scientists from Chile and NASA on board a P-3 Orion from the Chilean Navy collected the first radar sounding and laser altimetry survey of the glacier to reveal extensive thinning and acceleration in thinning. This discovery prompted an extensive airborne campaign in 2004 by the University of Texas at Austin, to be followed by subsequent airborne campaigns under NASA's IceBridge Campaign in 2009–2018.

The study also confirmed the importance of seafloor topography in predicting how the glacier will behave in the near future. However, the glacier has been considered to be the biggest threat on relevant time scales, for rising seas, current studies aim to better quantify retreat and possible impacts.

Since the 1980s, the glacier had a net loss of over 600 billion tons of ice up to 2017. In 2017, scientists discovered previously unknown volcanoes nearby.

In 2020, scientists discovered warm water underneath the glacier for the first time. The place where the glacier was in contact with the sea had been recorded as 2 degree Celsius above the freezing temperature. The discovery was a part of the International Thwaites Glacier Collaboration, a partnership primarily between US and UK academic institutions. This study has raised alarm regarding the glacier collapse, which can lead to nearly  rise in the sea level. Scientists noted that subglacial lakes upstream of Thwaites may have caused a minor speedup of the glacier near the grounding line in early 2013.

A 2022 study in Nature Geoscience described the "rapid retreat" of the Thwaites Glacier, inferring its past movement in the pre-satellite era by analyzing "ribs" formed on the ocean floor by tides and the ice.

Water drainage beneath the glacier
Swamp-like canal areas and streams underlie the glacier. The upstream swamp canals feed streams with dry areas between the streams which retard flow of the glacier. Due to this friction, the glacier is considered stable in the short term.

Predictions
A 2014 University of Washington study, using satellite measurements and computer models, predicted that the Thwaites Glacier will gradually melt, leading to an irreversible collapse over the next 200 to 1,000 years.

A 2021 study suggested that the Thwaites Ice Shelf, which currently restrains the eastern portion of the Thwaites Glacier, could start to collapse within five years, leading to the contribution to sea level rise from the eastern portion increasing and eventually becoming equivalent to that of the other, undefended portions of the glacier. Scientists do not assert that the entire glacier will collapse within five years, but that the ice shelf which rests on the ocean and restrains the eastern portion of the Thwaites Glacier. The floating ice shelf acts as a brace that prevents faster flow of the upstream ice. Under the hypothesis of marine ice cliff instability, the exposing of tall cliffs from the ice shelf's failure may lead to a chain reaction of collapse over centuries, although the accuracy of this hypothesis has been disputed by other studies.

According to Ted Scambos, a glaciologist at the University of Colorado Boulder and a leader of the International Thwaites Glacier Collaboration, in a late 2021 interview from McMurdo Station, "Things are evolving really rapidly here. It's daunting." At a meeting of the American Geophysical Union in New Orleans, Louisiana in December, the situation was described as worrisome. Fellow International Thwaites Glacier Collaboration glaciologist Erin Pettit noted in an interview with Science Magazine that Thwaites, along with the rest of the West Antarctic Ice Sheet, would start to see major losses "within decades" after the ice shelf's failure, and this would be especially pronounced if the anthropogenic emission trajectory does not decrease by then. In her own words: "We’ll start to see some of that before I leave this Earth."

A 2022 assessment of tipping points in the climate system did not consider Thwaites Glacier on its own, but it did note that the entire West Antarctic Ice Sheet would most likely take 2,000 years to disintegrate entirely once it crosses its tipping point, and the minimum plausible timescale is 500 years. (And could even be as long as 13,000 years.) Yet, it also noted that this tipping point for the entire ice sheet is no more than 3 °C of global warming away, and is very likely to be triggered around the near-future levels of 1.5 °C: at worst, it may have even been triggered by now, after the warming passed 1 °C in the recent years.

Features and observation

Thwaites Glacier Tongue

The Thwaites Glacier Tongue, or Thwaites Ice Tongue, is about 50 km wide and has progressively shortened due to ice calving, based on the observational record. It was initially delineated from aerial photographs collected during Operation Highjump in January 1947.

On 15 March 2002, the National Ice Center reported that an iceberg named B-22 broke off from the ice tongue. This iceberg was about 85 km long by 65 km wide, with a total area of some 5,490 km2. As of 2003, B-22 had broken into five pieces, with B-22A still in the vicinity of the tongue, while the other smaller pieces had drifted farther west.

Thwaites Iceberg Tongue
The Thwaites Iceberg Tongue was a large iceberg tongue which was aground in the Amundsen Sea, about 32 km northeast of Bear Peninsula. The feature was about 112 km long and 32 km wide, and in January 1966 its southern extent was only 5 km north of Thwaites Glacier Tongue. It consisted of icebergs which had broken off from the Thwaites Ice Tongue and ran aground, and should not be confused with the latter, which is still attached to the grounded ice. It was delineated by the USGS from aerial photographs collected during Operation Highjump and Operation Deepfreeze. It was first noted in the 1930s, but finally detached from the ice tongue and broke up in the late 1980s.

Underwater cavity 
In January 2019, NASA discovered an underwater cavity beneath the glacier, with an area two-thirds the size of Manhattan. The cavity formed mostly in the previous three years and is nearly 1,000 feet (305 m) tall, likely speeding up the glacier's decay. Thwaites currently contributes roughly 4% to global sea level rise.

International Thwaites Glacier Collaboration (ITGC) 
A 5-year international collaboration to study the Thwaites Glacier was established in 2018.

At the beginning of 2020, researchers from the ITGC took measurements to develop scenarios for the future of the glacier and to predict the time frame for a possible collapse: The erosion of the glacier by warmed ocean water seems to be stronger than expected. The researchers noted with concern that, at the baseline of the glacier, the temperature of the water is already more than two degrees above freezing point. They confirm thawing of the Thwaites Glacier contributes about four percent of global sea-level rise. The collapse of this glacier alone would raise the sea level by about 65 centimetres (25 inches).

False claims on Thwaites Glacier Meltdown 
In October 2022, a researcher claimed that the  doomsday glacier was retreating at a slow rate and that scientist had found a massive slowdown in melting. In the article, it was also claimed that human caused climate change was not a factor in the retreating of the glacier.

See also 

Pine Island Glacier
Retreat of glaciers since 1850
Sif Island
Thwaites Ice Shelf

List of volcanoes in Antarctica
List of seamounts in the Southern Ocean

References

External links 
 
 Thwaites Glacier on geographic.org
 International Thwaites Glacier Collaboration ITGC website
  published Feb 19, 2020 PBS NewsHour
 Surprising Ebb and Flow of Vast Subglacial Lakes Revealed by CryoSat. On: ScitechDaily. December 14, 2020. Source: European Space Agency (ESA)

Glaciers of Marie Byrd Land
Ice streams of Antarctica
West Antarctica